The Presidential Commission of Uganda held the office of President of Uganda between 22 May and 15 December 1980. It was composed as follows:

Leaders and member Interim Government of Presidential Commission of Uganda

See also
Uganda
Uganda since 1979, part of the History of Uganda series.
President of Uganda
Politics of Uganda
Political parties of Uganda

External links

 World Statesmen – Uganda
 Rulers.org – Uganda

Sources 

History of Uganda
Government of Uganda